Iris flavescens, also known as the lemonyellow iris, is a species of Iris that has distichous leaves and pale yellow flowers. It is similar in appearance to Iris sambucina, although with flowers that are more faded in colour. It can be found in Pennsylvania, United States.

References

External links
 USDA Database: Iris flavescens Delile, Geographic distribution, Taxonomy

flavescens
Flora of Pennsylvania
Flora of the Appalachian Mountains
Garden plants of North America
Flora without expected TNC conservation status